Marta Cardona de Miguel (born 26 May 1995) is a Spanish professional footballer who plays as a right winger for Liga F club Atlético de Madrid and the Spain women's national team.

Club career
Cardona started her career at Zaragoza CFF. She left the team of her city in 2018 for signing with Levante, where she rested one season before agreeing terms with Real Sociedad.

Cardona moved to Real Madrid in the summer of 2020 following the end of her contract with Real Sociedad. She went on to have a brilliant first season with the capital club and was widely recognised as the most impactful attacker on the team. Her efforts saw her awarded by Spanish daily Marca at the end of the season.

International career
Cardona made her senior debut for Spain on 4 October 2019 in a UEFA Women's Euro 2021 qualifying Group D match against Azerbaijan.

International goals

References

External links
Marta Cardona at Txapeldunak 

1995 births
Living people
Footballers from Zaragoza
Spanish women's footballers
Women's association football midfielders
Zaragoza CFF players
Levante UD Femenino players
Real Sociedad (women) players
Real Madrid Femenino players
Atlético Madrid Femenino players
Primera División (women) players
Spain women's international footballers
UEFA Women's Euro 2022 players
21st-century Spanish women